Gottfried August Homilius composed Passions for Good Friday services at the Kreuzkirche in Dresden where he was music director (Kreuzkantor), including oratorios based on the gospels of Matthew and John, Luke and Mark in German.

Background 
His music is mostly in the then new style of Empfindsamkeit, trying to reach listeners emotionally, but he also incorporated the tradition of counterpoint in his works.

His works were neglected, but have been revived increasingly, beginning with Dresden musicians, especially the Dresdner Kreuzchor.

Passions 

Homilius composed several Passions for performances in services Good Friday. His most popular work dealing with the passion of Jesus was a cantata, "Ein Lämmlein geht und trägt die Schuld", HoWV 2. It is in 31 movements in two parts, based on poetry. It was published in 1775 during his lifetime,

Homilius composed four oratorio Passions in the older style using the Biblical account from the gospels, in the tradition of Bach's St John Passion and St Matthew Passion:
 HoWV 1.3 Matthäuspassion "Ein Lämmlein geht und trägt die Schuld"
 HoWV 1.4 Johannespassion "Der Fromme stirbt"
 HoWV 1.5 Lukaspassion "Du starker Keltertreter"
 HoWV 1.10 Markuspassion "So gehst du nun, mein Jesu, hin"

These works are among the last Passions in the 18th century. They retain the gospel texts, but restrict the function of the chorus mainly to chorales and the crowd choruses setting direct speech from the gospels.

Matthäuspassion
The Matthäuspassion (St Matthew Passion) "Ein Lämmlein geht und trägt die Schuld", HoWV 1.3, is a Passion in two parts of 50 movements, scored for six soloists, four-part choir and orchestra. It begins with the a chorale, "Ein Lämmlein geht und trägt die Schuld".

The Passion is not yet published; a critical edition by Carus-Verlag is in preparation, but was held up by the COVID-19 pandemic. The Passion features choruses that lay choirs are able to perform, but solo movements are written for professionals.

Schoener also prepared handwritten performance material. The Passion was performed by the Schiersteiner Kantorei, conducted by Clemens Bosselmann, at the Marktkirche Wiesbaden on 11 March 2023. with soloists Helena Bickel, Jean-Max Lattemann, Gabriel Sin, and again Klaus Mertens, Georg Poplutz as the Evangelist], Frederic Mörth as the voice of Christ, and the Barockorchester La Vivezza. Bosselmann had known excerpts of the work since he sang with the Kreuzchor as a boy.

Johannespassion
The Johannespassion (St John Passion), "Der Fromme stirbt", HoWV 1.4, is a Passion scored for five soloists, a four-part choir SATB and orchestra The final movement has a transition from A minor to a "celebratory" A major, in keeping with John's interpretation of the crucifixion as a victory.

It was published in a critical edition by Carus-Verlag.

Lukaspassion
The Lukaspassion, (St Luke Passion), "Du starker Keltertreter", HoWV 1.5, is a Passion scored for four voices and orchestra.  It was the model for a Passion by C. P. E. Bach.

Markuspassion
The Markuspassion (St Mark Passion), "So gehst du nun, mein Jesu, hin", HoWV 1.10, is an oratorio in 47 movements composed first performed on 17 April 1767. It is scored for six soloists, four-part choir and orchestra.

It was the model for a Passion by C. P. E. Bach. It is scheduled to be performed by the chorale of the Berlin Cathedral in 2023.

References

External links 
 Gottfried August Homilius (Composer, Organ, Kantor, Copyist, Bach's Pupil?) Bach Cantatas Website 2022

Passions